Alcohol prohibition in Tamil Nadu  is governed by State Prohibition and Excise department as per Tamil Nadu Prohibition Act, 1937. TASMAC, state government owned company controls the wholesale and retail vending of alcoholic beverages in the State. On 24 May 2016, after swearing-in J. Jayalalitha has announced to close 500 liquor shops and reduce the business hours of State-run liquor shops across the State. On 20 February 2017, the first office order signed by the Chief Minister Edappadi K. Palaniswami was the closure of 500 liquor outlets owned by the public sector TASMAC. This is in addition to the 500 liquor outlets closed down by late Chief Minister J Jayalalithaa in May 2016.

Prohibition before Independence
Madras Abkari Act, 1886 was imposed and set in place a strict regulation which banned the local manufacturing of alcohol and confined it to central distilleries where excise duty was paid prior to being sold. This British tax policy favored the consumption of foreign liquors over more traditional drinks such as toddy and country liquors. One fifth of the Madras Presidency population consumed alcohol. Excise revenue from Madras Presidency accounted for as much as 38% of its total revenue. As per Historian Robert Eric Colvard, alcohol consumption came to be defined as something "foreign" and inherently anti-Indian by nationalists. Major Indian freedom struggle like the Swadeshi, Non-Cooperation, and Civil Disobedience movement played vital role in anti-alcohol agitation. When Congress won with majority in Madras Presidency in 1937, C. Rajagopalachari imposed alcohol prohibition in Salem district then later extended throughout the presidency.

Prohibition after Independence
Though prohibition was relaxed on other states after independence including former Madras Presidency regions, Tamil Nadu continued to adopt total prohibition until 1971. In 1971 the DMK government led by M. Karunanidhi suspended it in 1971 and allowed the sale of arrack and toddy. But later, the same government stopped the sale of these in 1974. In 1981, the AIADMK government headed by M.G. Ramachandran lifted prohibition and reintroduced the sale of arrack and toddy. Due to wide use of the methanol in industries and there were no restrictions in other States, In 1984 September methanol was removed from the purview of the Tamil Nadu Prohibition Act. In 1987, the sale of arrack and toddy was again banned. During 1975-76 and 1988–90, illicit liquor claimed many lives in Tamil Nadu. In 1990, the DMK government revived the sale of arrack and toddy. In 1991 July 16, again the sale of arrack and toddy was banned by new government led by J. Jayalalitha. Methanol was substituted and consumed under the illegal liquor trade. In 2002, Methanol brought again under Prohibition act

TASMAC

Whenever government imposed prohibition, the illegal sale of toddy and arrack along with consumption of methanol, an industrial solvent resulting in loss of several lives, Which paving way for lifting the ban. In 2001, prohibition was lifted again and TASMAC became the wholesale monopoly for alcohol. In January 2002, the Tamil Nadu government under O. Panneerselvam started selling low-cost liquor through TASMAC. In 2014-15, the annual revenue of TASMAC was Rs. 26,188 crores and the company sold 48.23 lakh cases of liquor.

Anti-liquor agitations
Fifty nine year old Gandhian Sasi Perumal protested to demand closure of a TASMAC shop in Kanyakumari. During the protest on 31 July 2015, Perumal climbed up a mobile phone tower and began losing his consciousness led to death. In August 2015, residents of Kalingapatty village in Tirunelveli district, was led by Mariammal, mother of Vaiko ransacked nearby TASMAC outlet to call for prohibition in the state. On 30 October 2015, police arrested Kovan, a Folk artist and a member of extreme Left group Makkal Kalai Iyakkam, who was criticising government policy on earning revenue by selling liquor.

Related Acts and Rules
 Tamil Nadu Prohibition Act, 1937
 The Tamil Nadu Neera and Padaneer Rules, 1939 
 The Tamil Nadu Molasses Control and Regulation Rules, 1958. 
 The Tamil Nadu Denatured Spirit, Methyl alcohol and Varnish (French Polish) Rules, 1959 
 The Tamil Nadu Spirituous Essence Rules, 1972 
 The Tamil Nadu Disposal of Articles (Confiscated under Tamil Nadu Prohibition Act, 1937) Rules, 1979 
 The Tamil Nadu Distillery Rules, 1981 
 The Tamil Nadu Indian Made Foreign Spirit (Manufacture) Rules, 1981
 The Tamil Nadu Liquor (Licence and Permit) Rules, 1981 
 The Tamil Nadu Liquor Transit Rules, 1982 
 The Tamil Nadu Indian Made Foreign Spirit (Supply by Wholesale) Rules, 1983
 The Tamil Nadu Brewery Rules, 1983 
 The Tamil Nadu Prohibition Appeal and Revision Rules, 1983 
 The Tamil Nadu Mass Wine Rules, 1984 
 The Tamil Nadu Chloral Hydrate Rules, 1984 
 The Tamil Nadu Spirituous Preparation (Control) Rules, 1987 
 The Tamil Nadu Rectified Spirit Rules, 2000

References

Alcohol in Tamil Nadu
Alcohol law in India
History of Tamil Nadu